Charles Seckford (1551–1592), of Great Bealings, Suffolk, was an English politician. He was a Member (MP) of the Parliament of England for Aldeburgh in 1572.

Charles married Mary, daughter of Thomas Steyning and Frances de Vere.

References

1551 births
1592 deaths
English MPs 1572–1583
People from Suffolk Coastal (district)